1999 Omiya Ardija season

Competitions

Domestic results

J.League 2

Emperor's Cup

J.League Cup

Player statistics

Other pages
 J.League official site

Omiya Ardija
Omiya Ardija seasons